Buzz Lightyear's Space Ranger Spin (also known as Buzz Lightyear Astro Blasters at California, Tokyo and Hong Kong, Buzz Lightyear Laser Blast at Paris and Buzz Lightyear Planet Rescue at Shanghai) is an interactive shooting dark ride attraction located in the Tomorrowland area of the Disney theme parks. Designed by Walt Disney Imagineering, this attraction combines a carnival game and a third-generation Omnimover system. It is inspired by Disney/Pixar's Toy Story franchise, and contains several elements loosely based on the cartoon series Buzz Lightyear of Star Command.

The attraction first opened at Magic Kingdom on November 3, 1998. Subsequent versions can be found at Tokyo Disneyland, Disneyland, Disneyland Park in Paris, and Shanghai Disneyland. Although each ride may have a different name, all share the same major plot and characters. The ride formerly existed at Hong Kong Disneyland under the name  Buzz Lightyear Astro Blasters, but was closed in September 2017. For a brief period from the Shanghai version's opening in 2016 until the Hong Kong version's closure in 2017, the attraction was only one of two that could be found at all six Disney castle parks worldwide (the other attraction being Dumbo the Flying Elephant).

History
The backstory of the ride revolves around the attempts of Evil Emperor Zurg (voiced by Ken Mitchroney in Space Ranger Spin, Tesshō Genda in Astro Blasters at Tokyo Disneyland, Andrew Stanton at Astro Blasters in Disneyland and Hong Kong Disneyland and Laurent Gamelon in Astro Blasters in Disneyland Paris, and an unknown actor in Planet Rescue) to steal the batteries (known as "crystallic fusion cells") used to power the space vehicles of the "Little Green Men" (voiced by Jeff Pidgeon). Participants are "Star Command" raw recruits sent to defeat Zurg. The queue area is awash in the chartreuse, white, and bright blue hues of Buzz Lightyear himself (voiced by Pat Fraley, who does voice for all Buzz Lightyear attractions [minus the Shanghai and Japanese rides]). Since Buzz Lightyear is a toy, the attraction is cleverly scaled to give the illusion that one has just been reduced to the size of an action figure, featuring such detail as giant, exposed Philips screw heads and an explanation of the interactive phase of the ride that resembles a toy's instruction sheet, only on a gigantic scale. An Audio-Animatronic Buzz Lightyear figure and giant Etch-a-Sketch (Disneyland) and/or View-Master (Walt Disney World) provide explanation of the "mission" to destroy Zurg's secret weapon with your blasters. While his body is audio-animatronic, Buzz's face is actually a screen with a projection of computer animation, allowing better lipsync and more expressive features, making him look like a more realistic representation of the character from the films.

Technical aspects
"Astro Blasters" and "Space Ranger Spin" are equal parts shooting gallery and dark ride. Visitors board an Omnimover space vehicle featuring two laser pistols and a joystick. The pistols are used to shoot laser beams at targets of varying point values. Targets that are hit while lit up will produce much higher scores. A digital readout on the dashboard shows the player's score. The joystick allows full 360-degree rotation of the vehicle to assist in aiming. During the ride, if the ride slows down or completely stops (this is a result of either a handicapped guest or a ride breakdown), this allows for "bonus points" as the pistols and targets do not turn off. There are 4 different shaped targets which are worth different numbers of points: round (100 points), square (1,000 points), diamond (5,000 points), and triangle (10,000 points).

At the conclusion of the ride, the digital score flashes L1-L7 displaying the ranking or level achieved for the below scores:

 Level 1 Star Cadet: 0 – 1,000
 Level 2 Space Scout: 1,001 – 10,000
 Level 3 Ranger 1st Class: 10,001 – 100,000
 Level 4 Planetary Pilot: 100,001 – 300,000
 Level 5 Space Ace: 300,001 – 600,000
 Level 6 Cosmic Commando: 600,001 – 999,998
 Level 7 Galactic Hero: 999,999+

Some of the rides feature an on-ride photo, which depending on the park may be available as a free electronic postcard via e-mail at the exit, or be available for purchase on the Disney's PhotoPass system. The photos include the player's score. If the score is in the top 100 highest of the day, the player's ranking may be included in the photo. The Top 10 players' scores are shown on the scoreboard at the exit queue. The top person gets their face posted on the screen. The Disneyland version once featured at-home play tied directly to the attraction itself via the Internet, however this is disabled.

The installation at the Magic Kingdom utilizes an existing ride system by Arrow Development, originally constructed in 1972 for If You Had Wings. The ride was designed and manufactured by Sansei Technologies, Inc. with the corporation of Walt Disney Imagineering.

History

Magic Kingdom
The layout and systems of the ride date all the way back to 1972. This space was originally home to If You Had Wings, an aviation themed ride sponsored by Eastern Airlines. Eastern Airlines dropped sponsorship of the ride for financial reasons in early June 1987. All Eastern themes were removed, and the ride was renamed If You Could Fly. If You Could Fly was closed down in January 1989.

The installation of Space Ranger Spin also impacted the Tomorrowland Transit Authority PeopleMover, which runs through the south show building. The Tomorrowland Transit Authority, or TTA as it is often called for short, had opened in 1975 as the WEDway PeopleMover. At that time, If You Had Wings was the attraction occupying the south show building. Three diorama windows were also positioned on the track: two on the right and one on the left. These allowed the Mexico, Jamaica, and Trinidad scenes to be visible to riders on the Tomorrowland Transit Authority in such a way as to hide all projectors, lights and other show support equipment.

The diorama windows were altered once more when If You Had Wings was transformed into Delta Dreamflight. This was done because the windows no longer correctly lined up with show scenes. The first window was replaced with backlit panels depicting the ride's barnstormer scene. Window two looked into the Parisian Excursion scene, from a viewpoint which heavily distorted the tableau's forced perspective. The third window would have had TTA riders looking directly into an extremely bright light and so was completely obscured with plywood and black fabric.

In October 1997, Disney announced that Buzz Lightyear's Space Ranger Spin would be added to Magic Kingdom. When Delta Dreamflight transitioned yet again into the current attraction in 1998, the first window was refitted with the diorama of the hair salon, and the second left open to look into the new attraction, though concern was expressed over the fact that this view allows TTA riders to look directly into banks of high-powered blacklights. At one point during Space Ranger Spin, it is possible to catch a glimpse of the TTA passing through the building. The ride was briefly sponsored by Mattel from opening day to 1999.

Buzz Lightyear's Space Ranger Spin was named the 2004 Disney Magazine Reader's Choice Award winner for Best Magic Kingdom Park Attraction for Young Kids.

Disneyland
Like the Magic Kingdom version at Walt Disney World, it uses infrastructure from previous attractions. Its show building originally housed the Circle-Vision 360° theater. In 1997, as part of a major makeover of Tomorrowland, the Circle-Vision theater was removed and the space became part of the queue for the now infamous Rocket Rods. The Rocket Rods, which were prone to breakdowns, ran from 1998 to 2000. This space was then unused until 2005, when Astro Blasters opened.

Queue

Magic Kingdom
The queue of the ride shows different pictures of Buzz Lightyear and the Little Green Men. It also shows the battery cells and pipes plugging into Star Command. Guests then pass the Buzz Lightyear animatronic (This version of the animatronic has his wings open and is not holding anything). After listening to what he has to say, guests then leave that room and board the XP 37. Attached to them are ion laser canons and a joystick to spin the cart.

Disneyland
Astro Blasters features more dialogue than Space Ranger Spin does. This ride's queue (as well as the other Astro Blasters/ Laser Blast) includes a walkie talkie with Buzz Lightyear on it reading his wrist communication device. The speakers provide backstory to the ride and how Zurg is attacking Green Planet, home of the Little Green Men. It also includes a picture of Zurg as wanted criminal number one. It has pictures of The green squadron leaving to attack. It also has posters describing the blasters and the XP 40 Star cruiser. In the Fast Pass line, there is a picture of Buzz Lightyear shooting a purple, green and orange colored alien. There is also a mural that depicts Lightyear leading a team of Space rangers. This mural is notable for seemingly featuring the character of Princess Mira Nova from the cartoon Buzz Lightyear of Star Command, although for some reason she has 3 eyes. The guests enter the briefing room to see Buzz Lightyear. This animatronic has no wings out and is holding an Astro Blaster. The Astro Blaster has a timer for when Buzz does his talking. As he says his line about finding Zurg's robot, the astro blaster lights up and blasts its laser at the Etch A Sketch, wiping off the picture of Zurg. However, in Paris, the laser can't keep up with the timer and it shines a little early. The animatronic gives a one-minute speech before a red alarm goes off signaling for the line to move along. The guest proceed down a long Corridor seeing the LGMs testing the Blasters. The guests then board the Star cruiser.

Shanghai Disneyland
The Queue has the look of a Star Tours type attraction and is the longest indoor queue for all of the versions of the attraction. It looks like the International Space Station. The walls are covered with pictures of Buzz Lightyear himself. Video monitors are displayed on some of those walls. The monitors play videos of the LGMS, and Zurg with his new weapon. Buzz Lightyear will also appear on the screen fighting the robots. Most of the videos show the Star command space ship. Each ship has a red and green blaster on each side. After the queue, guests will walk into the room where the space cruisers are.

Attraction

Magic Kingdom
The Magic Kingdom's version of the ride, known as Buzz Lightyear's Space Ranger Spin, is the first Buzz Lightyear attraction, and the third Omnimover ride to operate in Tomorrowland's south show building. Unlike other versions of the attraction, Magic Kingdom's version features laser guns that are stationary.

The ride begins when the cart enters a room with four blue colored astronauts holding guns aimed at a disco ball. The ride then enters a robot attack scene. An orange robot called the Box-O-Bot (originally labeled as a Rock 'Em Sock 'Em Robot during the Mattel sponsorship), a blue and purple robot called the Gigantobot, a green robot called the Battery Bot, and a Dog Bot are all present in this scene. The ride then slopes down a short hill into Planet Z. Here guests encounter many aliens including space chickens, space spiders, and others. There is also a volcano that is shooting green goo. The guests then enter Zurg's fortress where they see a battery delivery. Zurg is in his spaceship, which he calls his Spiderbot. In the next room the aliens show the guests that Zurg has escaped. The next room is the projection tunnel and in it Zurg is shooting at the guests. The final room shows Buzz Lightyear fighting with Zurg in the now destroyed Spiderbot. The Little green men help Buzz tear it apart. Then the unload area shows Buzz Lightyear thanking the guests while holding Zurg in the claw. Guests will then exit the ride into Store Command where they can purchase a photo of themselves on the ride.

Mattel, having just transferred its sponsorship from the It's a Small World attraction thus in turn making that attraction sponsorless in nearby Fantasyland originally sponsored the Walt Disney World attraction from its opening to 1999 when all references to Mattel were removed from the attraction. The Disney World version has been without sponsorship ever since.

Disneyland

Disneyland's version of the ride is called Buzz Lightyear Astro Blasters.

A key difference between this ride and its counterpart at Walt Disney World's Magic Kingdom is that its laser guns can be removed from their mounts to allow for more accurate shooting (similar to Men in Black: Alien Attack). The laser guns at Space Ranger Spin at Magic Kingdom cannot be removed from their mounts and have limited movement.

The ride begins in the robot attack scene with The Box-O-Bot, The Gigantobot (who have changed positions and coloring as in WDW's version, The Box-O-Bot was neon orange and was on the left side of the track and the Gigantobot was dark blue and purple and was on the right side of the track. Now-Box O-Bot is just orange and is on the right and the Gigantobot has a red body and red ears. The Dogbot, who now has a brown color and the Batterybot, who is now red and has a target on his nose [This variation is in Paris and in California while a similar version with a target on his forehead is in Tokyo and Hong Kong] are all present during this scene. There is also a mini Space Ranger in what looks like an X Wing. The Guests enter Zurg's Dreadnought down a hallway shooting batteries until you reach his laboratory. Zurg is shooting his "Zurgatronic Ion Blaster" (he dubbed it this in BLoSC). He is standing behind his now damaged Secret Weapon. Guests are about to transition into the next room which is completely dark while robots are being electrocuted trying to land the Dreadnought. The Guests enter Planet Z (In the French Version of the ride Buzz Lightyear says "Attention Space Rangers, you've landed on Planet Z! Be ready for anything"). Guests can shoot aliens including a call back to the pterodactyl that belongs to Sid Phillips in the First Toy Story Film. Before leaving Planet Z, Zurg is laughing in when he thinks he has triumphed because he is about to shoot Green Planet. Guests then enter a light tunnel with Zs around it. The next room is similar to Space Ranger Spin. Buzz Lightyear is using his Astro Blaster to take down Zurg's Secret Weapon. The Green Squadron are helping Buzz take down the ship. The final room has the LGMs signing the receipt to return Zurg to Al's Toys Barn. Zurg promises revenge as the Green Squadron thank the guests. Buzz Lightyear then thanks the guests. He tells them to put the Blasters where they belong and to check the score board. Guests exit the ride to Little Green Men's Store command.

Hong Kong Disneyland and Tokyo Disneyland

The Tokyo version is the original version of the ride and all of the ride's audio is in Japanese. At Hong Kong Disneyland, the ride is also called Buzz Lightyear Astro Blasters and is extremely similar to the Tokyo version, with a more elaborate queue. The Hong Kong version features English dialogue, though safety announcements are trilingual. Those two versions also featured a floating Planet Z outside of the space ship. On November 22, 2016, Disney announced that the ride would be closing. In its place would be the park's second Marvel-themed ride, Ant-Man and The Wasp: Nano Battle! The ride closed on August 31, 2017. However, Tokyo Disneyland's version is still operating today.

Disneyland Paris
At Disneyland Paris, Buzz Lightyear Laser Blast replaced the Circle-Vision 360° production Le Visionarium, which closed in 2004. This version of the ride is much like the Disneyland version, Buzz Lightyear Astro Blasters, except for the presence of a tribute to Le Visionarium: When you are in the robot attack scene at the beginning, if you look beneath the left arm of the Box-O-Bot, you might be able to see 9-Eye (the Circumvisual Photodroid from Le Visionarium) hiding there. However, it is an easy to miss tribute.

In the Paris version of the ride, the dialogue is the same but translated into French as well as English. In the queue, the Buzz Lightyear animatronic speaks English, as well as French for those who speak French, and don't understand English. Some areas of the ride provide both dialogues, but in the scene where Zurg's weapon is half-destroyed, it switches from English to French in a 6 dialogue loop as it does in the California version of the ride. This ride's cruiser is called the XP 41 calling back to the California version. This is also the version with the second longest indoor queue.

Shanghai Disneyland 
The most recent version of this attraction is called Buzz Lightyear Planet Rescue. It is based on the opening sequence of Toy Story 2, set on Zurg's home planet and featuring the robots seen in the film.

As the ride begins, Buzz and the Little Green Men help guests take down the Zurg robots. Later, Buzz is seen fighting two of the robotic giants. The vehicles then move into a mine where Zurg is engineering a mega weapon. He unleashes more robots as Buzz struggles to stop the mining operation. Zurg is finally defeated and vows revenge.

Other appearances 

In 2005, the Walt Disney Company premiered a home version of the ride in the form of an internet video game that allows users to connect with guests at the parks. The scores of each guest from the dark ride are tallied with the internet gamer and increase the points won.

There was also a bumper car attraction at Walt Disney World's DisneyQuest with the name "Buzz Lightyear's Astroblaster" where players rode and controlled enclosed bumper cars while shooting "asteroids" (black foam soccer balls) at each other. Getting hit by a ball at a specific target caused the cars to spin around and flash lights for a few seconds. However, that attraction was closed when DisneyQuest shut its doors in 2017.

The 2019 video game Kingdom Hearts III features a virtual version of the ride as one of its "Attraction Flow" theme park-inspired attacks, allowing the player to attack enemies with similar mechanics and visual style as the real ride.

Voice cast

Pat Fraley as Buzz Lightyear
Ken Mitchroney (Walt Disney World), and Andrew Stanton  (Disneyland) as Zurg
Jeff Pidgeon as Green Squadron
Peter Renaday as Space Ranger #1 (Disneyland versions only)
TBA as Space Ranger #2 (Disneyland versions only)
B. J. Ward as Space Ranger #3 and Star Command (Disneyland versions only)
Jeff Fischer as Space Ranger #4 (Disneyland versions only)

Tokyo Disneyland Version
Minoru Inaba as Buzz Lightyear
Toshiharu Sakurai as Green Squadron
Tesshō Genda as Zurg
TBA as Star Command
TBA as Space Ranger #1
TBA as Space Ranger #2
TBA as Space Ranger #3
TBA as Space Ranger #4

Disneyland Paris Version
Richard Darbois as Buzz Lightyear
Laurent Gamelon as Zurg
Christophe Lemoine as Green Squadron
TBA as Star Command
TBA as Space Ranger #1
TBA as Space Ranger #2
TBA as Space Ranger #3
TBA as Space Ranger #4

Gallery

See also
Magic Kingdom attraction and entertainment history
List of current Disneyland attractions
Tokyo Disneyland attraction and entertainment history
Toy Story Midway Mania

External links 
 Disneyland Official Website
 Magic Kingdom Official Website
 Tokyo Disneyland Official Website
 Disneyland Paris Official Website
 Shanghai Disneyland Official Website

References

Buzz Lightyear of Star Command
Amusement rides introduced in 1998
Amusement rides introduced in 2004
Amusement rides introduced in 2005
Amusement rides that closed in 2017
Amusement rides introduced in 2006
Amusement rides introduced in 2016
Amusement rides manufactured by Arrow Dynamics
Amusement rides manufactured by Sansei Technologies
Dark rides
Disneyland
Magic Kingdom
Tokyo Disneyland
Hong Kong Disneyland
Disneyland Park (Paris)
Shanghai Disneyland
Pixar in amusement parks
Tomorrowland
Toy Story
Omnimover attractions
Audio-Animatronic attractions
Outer space in amusement parks
Walt Disney Parks and Resorts attractions
Former Walt Disney Parks and Resorts attractions
Buzz Lightyear